KPRO (93.5 FM) is an American radio station licensed to serve Altus, Oklahoma, United States. The station, established in 1974, is owned and operated by James G Boles , Jr. It airs a full service mix of music, news, sports, and local programming. The station is simulcast on sister station KWHW (1450 AM).

Programming
KPRO broadcasts a full-service country music format along with farm reports on weekdays. Sunday programming is primarily church broadcasts and Gospel music programming. KPRO airs a tradio program called "Swap Shop" on weekday and Saturday mornings. The station broadcasts the meetings of the Altus City Council on the first and third Tuesdays of each month. KPRO also airs select sporting events involving Altus High School and the Oklahoma State Cowboys. Some of the station's news and music programming comes from Citadel Media, Dial Global,.

KPRO's morning show is hosted by Eddie Wilcoxen. He is a published poet, recognized landscape designer, karate champion, and was named as an official Olympic Hero in 1996.  In January 2011, Wilcoxen was named Poet Laureate for the state of Oklahoma for 2011 though 2012 by the Oklahoma Humanities Council.

History
On April 1, 1974, KWHW-FM signed on at 93.5 FM as a sister station to KWHW (1450 AM). In April 1984, broadcast license holder KWHW Radio, Inc., reached an agreement to sell KWHW and KWHW-FM to Altus Radio, Inc. The deal was approved by the Federal Communications Commission (FCC) on May 29, 1984, and the transaction was formally consummated on July 2, 1984. The station's call sign was changed to KRKZ by the FCC on November 11, 1984.

In October 2003, Altus Radio, Inc., made a deal to sell this station, along with sister stations KWHW in Altus and KQTZ in Hobart, to Monarch Broadcasting, Inc, for a combined sale price of $1,800,000. The deal gained FCC approval on December 12, 2003, and the transaction was consummated on December 31, 2003.

The station was reassigned the KWHW-FM call sign by the FCC on May 30, 2011.

Effective September 8, 2021, Monarch Broadcasting sold KWHW-FM, KQTZ, KWHW, and translator K245CY to James G Boles, Jr. for $1. KWHW-FM became KPRO on October 7, 2021.

References

External links
 
 

PRO (FM)
Country radio stations in the United States
Radio stations established in 1974
Jackson County, Oklahoma